Ras Kimono (9 May 1958 – 10 June 2018) was a Nigerian reggae artist whose debut album Under Pressure, led by the single "Rum-Bar Stylée", was a big hit in the Nigerian music scene in 1989. Before he released his solo album, he was in a group called The Jastix along with Amos McRoy and Majek Fashek.

Oseloke Augustine Onwubuya, popularly known as Ras Kimono was born in Ekeleke Elumelu, Delta State, Nigeria, He started out his career as a student of Gbenoba Secondary School Agbor and later as a member of the Jastix Reggae Ital, alongside Majek Fashek, Amos McRoy Jegg and Black Rice Osagie. His music was greatly influenced by the poverty, inequality and hardship he witnessed in his early life. He released his solo debut album Under Pressure on the Premier Music label in 1989, which propelled him to instant continental stardom. The album had hits 
such as "Under Pressure", "Natty Get Jail" and the massive hit "Rhumba Style". He later released a string of hit albums, touring all over Africa, Europe and the United States, promoting his brand of reggae music. He  won several awards including the Nigeria Music Awards, Fame Music Awards and many more. In 2010, he was still performing to a loyal fan-base of all ages and his music is still played on radio, throughout West Africa. Kimono served a long apprenticeship on the Nigerian music circuit, experimenting with a number of styles, before making his late 1980s breakthrough as a reggae singer. Together with his Massive Dread Reggae Band. Kimono released his debut album, Under Pressure in 1989, accompanied by the popular single, "Rum-Bar Stylee", this revealed both a Jamaican and native African influence (the latter particularly evident in his ‘Patois’ delivery, as frequently employed by Fela Kuti to communicate with the urban underclass). His strongly polemical lyrics produced album sales of over 100,000 copies, and a fervent following for his advocacy of social change. What’s Gwan proved even more successful, with the topics selected including legalization of marijuana, and the need for Africans to intellectually repel colonialism and its arbitrary boundaries between tribes. Most controversially, he was not averse to naming directly those in power he saw as synonymous with backdoor imperialism.

He died at the age of 60 on 10 June 2018 in Lagos, Nigeria.

Discography
Under Pressure (1988)
What's Gwan? (1990)
Run Fi Cover (1992)
Lone Ranger (1994)
 Oracle of Jah (1996?)
Matter of Time  (2008)
Senseless Killing (2017)

References

1958 births
2018 deaths
Nigerian reggae musicians
Musicians from Delta State